Wikmani poisid (lit. Wikman Boys) is a 1995-year television drama serial about the Wikman Private Gymnasium students from 1937 till their mobilization in 1944. The series is based on a 1988 novel Wikmani poisid by Jaan Kross.

The series were first aired in 1995 on Estonia's Eesti Televisioon. Each episode runs at approximately 30 minutes. The show was created by Hugo Ader, Andres Maimik, Anu Soolep and Vilja Nyholm-Palm. DVD was published in the 2003.

Cast

References

External links
 Official website 

1990s Estonian television series
1994 Estonian television series debuts
Television shows based on novels
Eesti Televisioon original programming